John R. Baguley (born 30 June 1940) is an Australian former long jumper who competed in the 1960 Summer Olympics. He won a silver medal in the triple jump at the 1962 British Empire and Commonwealth Games.

References

1940 births
Living people
Australian male long jumpers
Australian male triple jumpers
Olympic athletes of Australia
Athletes (track and field) at the 1960 Summer Olympics
Athletes (track and field) at the 1962 British Empire and Commonwealth Games
Commonwealth Games silver medallists for Australia
Commonwealth Games medallists in athletics
Medallists at the 1962 British Empire and Commonwealth Games